Your Heart Belongs to Me is a novel by science fiction/horror writer Dean Koontz.  The plot revolves around Ryan Perry, who receives a heart transplant.

From the #1 New York Times bestselling master of suspense comes a riveting thriller that probes the deepest terrors of the human psyche—and the ineffable mystery of what truly makes us who we are. Here a brilliant young man finds himself fighting for his very existence in a battle that starts with the most frightening words of all…

Plot summary

Novels by Dean Koontz
2008 American novels
Psychological thriller novels

At thirty-four, Internet entrepreneur Ryan Perry seemed to have the world in his pocket—until the first troubling symptoms appeared out of nowhere. Within days, he’s diagnosed with incurable cardiomyopathy and finds himself on the waiting list for a heart transplant; it’s his only hope, and it’s dwindling fast. Ryan is about to lose it all…his health, his girlfriend Samantha, and his life.

One year later, Ryan has never felt better. Business is good and he hopes to renew his relationship with Samantha. Then the unmarked gifts begin to appear—a box of Valentine candy hearts, a heart pendant. Most disturbing of all, a graphic heart surgery video and the chilling message: Your heart belongs to me.

In a heartbeat, the medical miracle that gave Ryan a second chance at life is about to become a curse worse than death. For Ryan is being stalked by a mysterious woman who feels entitled to everything he has. She’s the spitting image of the twenty-six-year-old donor of the heart beating steadily in Ryan’s own chest.

And she’s come to take it back.